Gladiator (Melvin Potter) is a fictional character appearing in American comic books published by Marvel Comics. Potter was initially depicted as a supervillain and one of the first enemies of the superhero Daredevil. In civilian life, he is a costume designer at the Spotlight Costume Shop in New York City. He eventually reforms and became a great supporter of Daredevil.

Potter was portrayed by Matt Gerald in the streaming television series Daredevil, set in the Marvel Cinematic Universe (MCU).

Publication history

Gladiator first appeared in Daredevil #18 (July 1966), and was created by Stan Lee and John Romita Sr.

Fictional character biography
Melvin Potter was a costume designer who had the deluded belief that he was far better than any superhero. In order to prove his point, he designed a suit of battle armor for himself, complete with deadly wrist blades, and became known as the Gladiator. He battled Daredevil in his first criminal outing, and then met the Masked Marauder, another enemy of Daredevil's. Gladiator later appeared in Europe, where he fought Daredevil again, and was then invited to join the Maggia. He joined Electro's Emissaries of Evil to attack Daredevil again. Later, Gladiator aided Whitney Frost in a raid of Stark Enterprises, where he first fought Iron Man.

Gladiator later battled Daredevil again. Some time later, he fought Daredevil aboard an airplane in flight. He later allied with the Death-Stalker, and later still allied with the Beetle. While under control of the Purple Man, he attacked Daredevil. Gladiator had one last battle against Daredevil before deciding to reform. He began undergoing therapy from Betsy Beatty, whom he later married.

Now reformed, the Gladiator later allied with Daredevil and Elektra against the Hand. Donning his Gladiator costume again, Potter met Spider-Man.

Potter was pressured into producing a Daredevil costume for a madman in the employ of the crime lord known as the Kingpin, but Murdock comes to tell him to play along. Potter later donned his Gladiator costume again to discourage a youth from a life of crime.

He was later forced into working for the Kingpin's elderly predecessor Alexander Bont, who claimed that Potter had a four-year-old daughter that he had never met and that she would die if Potter did not help. Gladiator brought Murdock to Bont, who attempted to kill Murdock and assume his old mantle but instead died of a drug-induced heart attack. The Gladiator was defeated by the new White Tiger, and went back to prison.

Gladiator is accused of murdering two fellow inmates and Matt Murdock's law firm is defending him. Murdock's super-senses indicate that he is telling the truth when he claims he is innocent. However, at the end of the issue, taunted by another inmate, Gladiator snaps his handcuffs and brutally assaults the inmate and a corrections officer, only to surrender to another officer and claim once again that he didn't do it. Later, after being broken out of an armored car, Melvin beats a confused Daredevil and moves to the sewers, heading for his Gladiator costume. Gladiator then goes on a rampage in Chinatown, killing innocent people and then attacking Matt and Milla in a restaurant. After being knocked out, Matt reawakens in a police car to hear a voice that Gladiator will murder his wife. Matt finds the Gladiator and Milla, whom he proceeds to rescue and defeats the Gladiator. Melvin realizes what he has done and attempts suicide, but is saved by Daredevil. Potter is taken back to prison, and is heavily sedated after repeatedly banging his head against the wall. It is revealed that Mr. Fear had secretly administered chemicals to Potter that caused him to go irreversibly insane with rage.

As Iron Man hovers over New York figuring out what people want from him, one of the flashbacks to his recent fights shows Iron Man being knocked off the bridge while fighting Gladiator.

Powers and abilities
Gladiator has no superhuman abilities. However, he is a superb martial arts fighter and is very physically powerful. He wore a thick metal armor with a helmet and metallic gauntlets, and was armed with an arsenal of edged weapons and whirling, jagged circular sawblades made of titanium, one mounted on each gauntlet. Small rotors in the gauntlets cause the blades to rotate at high speeds, and the whirling blades could also be detached to serve as short-range missile weapons.

In civilian life, Potter is an accomplished clothing designer, proficient in drafting, design and sewing.

Other versions
In the alternate time of the 2005 "House of M" storyline, Gladiator appears as an assassin of the Kingpin.

The Ultimate Marvel universe version of Gladiator is an enemy of Spider-Man, and a crazed madman obsessed with "the emperor".

In other media
 Melvin Potter appears in Daredevil, portrayed by Matt Gerald. Introduced in the first season, this version is an inventor who was forced by Wilson Fisk to make protective suits for him. Upon learning of this, Matt Murdock convinces Potter to make him a suit in exchange for ensuring Fisk cannot threaten him anymore. In the third season, Fisk forces Potter to make a replica of Murdock's suit for Benjamin "Dex" Poindexter to frame Murdock as a criminal. Potter later attempts to corroborate the lie, but is arrested for violating his parole and assaulting federal agents.
 Melvin Potter appears in the Daredevil novel Predator's Smile, written by Christopher Golden.

References

External links
 Gladiator at Marvel Wiki
 

Characters created by John Romita Sr.
Characters created by Stan Lee
Comics characters introduced in 1966
Fictional characters from New York City
Fictional inventors
Fictional people in fashion
Marvel Comics male supervillains
Marvel Comics martial artists
Marvel Comics supervillains
Marvel Comics television characters